I Stand with You is the second studio album by the Dawn, released in 1988.

Background
The songs "The Moon", "Let Me Dance", "Wish You Were Here", "I Stand with You", "I'm Not Hurting Anymore" and "Magtanim ay 'Di Biro" were performed at Concert at the Park in Luneta. The back cover of the album has pictures of the band.

I Stand with You was the last album with Teddy Diaz; he was murdered on 21 August 1988. Lead vocalist Jett Pangan plays keyboards on the title track.

Track listing

Personnel
 Teddy Diaz — electric and lead guitar, background and harmony vocals on "Magtanim ay 'Di Biro"
 JB Leonor — drums, keyboards
 Jett Pangan — lead vocals, keyboards
 Carlos Balcells — bass guitar

Album Credits
Engineers: Boy Roxas, Nonie Tabios, Lito Balagtas, Martin Galan

References

The Dawn (band) albums
1988 albums
PolyEast Records albums